Lieutenant General Charles Emilius Gold (6 January 1809 – 29 July 1871) was an English officer of the 65th Regiment, British Army, and artist of historic importance but limited ability. He was born at Woolwich Common, Kent, England, on 6 January 1809 and obtained a commission in the 65th Regiment by purchase on 28 March 1828.

Gold retired from active service in New Zealand, in consequence of his promotion to the rank of major general, on 1 October 1860, having served 32 years with the 65th Regiment in British Guiana, Barbados (December 1829 – 1833), Canada (September 1838–July 1841), England and New Zealand (January 1847 – 1860). He'd commanded the forces in New Zealand for 14 years, particularly during the first engagements of the First Taranaki War.

He and his wife, Eleanor, had thirteen children. One of their sons, Walter Kelvington Gold (c 1847–1895), was a respected painter and secretary of the South Australian Society of Arts.

References

1809 births
1871 deaths
People from Woolwich
65th Regiment of Foot officers
British military personnel of the New Zealand Wars
19th-century New Zealand military personnel
New Zealand artists